Joy to the World: A Bluegrass Christmas is an album by the Charlie Daniels Band. It was released on October 13, 2009. There is a deluxe edition that is a CD/DVD.

Track listing

CD
 "Christmas Time's A-Comin'" (with the Grascals)
 "Christmas Time Down South" (with Aaron Tippin)
 "Blue Christmas" (with Jewel)
 "Mississippi Christmas Eve"
 "Hallelujah"
 "The Christmas Song" (with Dan Tyminski)
 "O Come All Ye Faithful" (with Kathy Mattea)
 "God Rest Ye Merry, Gentlemen" (with Evelyn Cox of the Cox Family)
 "Joy to the World"
 "the Christmas Story" from The Book of Luke (Luke 2:1-11)
 "Silent Night" (with Suzanne Cox of the Cox Family)
 "A Carolina Christmas Carol"

DVD
 Chapter 1: "Mississippi Christmas Eve"
 Chapter 2: "Hallelujah"
 Chapter 3: "Christmas Time's A Comin'" (with the Grascals)
 Chapter 4: "Blue Christmas" (with Suzanne Cox on the DVD)
 Chapter 5: "Silent Night" (with Suzanne Cox)
 Chapter 6: "God Rest Ye Merry, Gentlemen" (with Evelyn Cox)
 Chapter 7: "The Christmas Song" (with Dan Tyminski)
 Chapter 8: "Christmas Time Down South" (with Aaron Tippin)
 Chapter 9: "O Come All Ye Faithful" (with Kathy Mattea)
 Chapter 10: "Joy to the World" (with all artists)

Personnel
Charlie Daniels - Arranger, composer, fiddle, acoustic guitar, producer, readings, lead & background vocals
Charlie Hayward - Bass
Jeremy Abshire - Fiddle
Kristin Scott Benson - Banjo
Bruce Ray Brown - Dobro, 12 string acoustic guitar, background vocals
Carolyn Corlew - Background vocals
Evelyn & Suzanne Cox - vocals & background vocals
Terry Eldridge - Acoustic guitar, vocals
Aubrey Haynie - Fiddle, mandolin
Kevin Haynie - Banjo
Jewel - Vocals
Pat MacDonald - Cabasa, drums, shaker, tambourine
Kathy Mattea - Vocals
Danny Roberts - Mandolin
Terry Allan Smith - Bass, background vocals
Aaron Tippin - Vocals
Dan Tyminski - Vocals
Chris Wormer - Acoustic guitar

Chart performance
Joy to the World: A Bluegrass Christmas peaked at #8 on the U.S. "Billboard" Top Bluegrass Albums chart in 2009 and #39 on the U.S. "Billboard" Top Holiday Albums chart in 2010.

Review
Joy to the World: A Bluegrass Christmas received three and a half out of five stars from AllMusic with Stephen Thomas Erlewine's concluding in his review that "Charlie Daniels brings in a few friends for the rollicking Joy to the World: A Bluegrass Christmas. This pretty much relies on holiday standards, both secular and Christian, but they're not performed lazily: the Charlie Daniels Band plays these songs with no small amount of joy, making this a small season delight."

References 

2009 albums
Bluegrass albums
Charlie Daniels albums
Christmas albums by American artists
E1 Music albums